Tymoviridae is a family of single-stranded positive sense RNA viruses in the order Tymovirales. Plants serve as natural hosts. There are 42 species in this family, assigned to three genera, with two species unassigned to a genus.

Taxonomy
The family includes the following three genera:
 Maculavirus
 Marafivirus
 Tymovirus

Additionally, the following two species are not assigned to a genus:
 Bombyx mori latent virus
 Poinsettia mosaic virus

Proposed viruses
 Culex tymovirus
 Fig fleck-associated virus

Virology
The virions are non-enveloped and isometric with a diameter of around 30 nm, with an icosahedral structure and a triangulation number T=3.

The linear genome is between of 6–7.5 kilobases in length and encodes one large open reading frame. It is capped at the 5’ terminus. The 3’ terminus may have a tRNA-like structure or a polyA tract, depending upon the species. The genome is relatively cytosine rich.

Life cycle
Viral replication is cytoplasmic, and is lysogenic. Entry into the host cell is achieved by penetration into the host cell. Replication follows the positive stranded RNA virus replication model. Positive stranded RNA virus transcription is the method of transcription. Translation takes place by leaky scanning. The virus exits the host cell by monopartite non-tubule guided viral movement. Plants serve as the natural host. The virus is transmitted via a vector (insects). Transmission routes are vector and mechanical.

References

Further reading
 Martelli GP. Sabanadzovic S. Abou-Ghanem Sabanadzovic N. Edwards MC. Dreher T. (2002). The family Tymoviridae. Archives of Virology. 147(9):1837-46
 University of Leicester Microbiology

External links
 Viralzone: Tymoviridae
 ICTV
 UniProt Taxonomy

 
Virus families